Isabella Dageago is a Nauruan nurse and politician who currently serves as the Minister Health and Home Affairs in the Parliament of Nauru.

Career 
Prior to entering politics, Dageago trained and qualified as a nurse.

In the 2019 Nauruan parliamentary election, Dageago was elected as one of two Members of Parliament for Yaren District, alongside incumbent Charmaine Scotty; she unseated former Minister of Foreign Affairs Kieren Keke. Dageago ran as an independent. Dageago and Scotty were the only female MPs elected.

In that election, President Baron Waqa lost his seat, and was succeeded by Lionel Aingimea. Aingimea named Dageago as a member of his Cabinet, giving her the portfolios for Health and Home Affairs.

During Dageago's tenure as Minister Health, she has led Nauru's response to the worldwide COVID-19 pandemic, including declaring a national emergency in March 2020. In April 2021, Dageago personally issued the country's first vaccine to Aingimea; by May, she announced that the entire adult population of Nauru - accounting for 63% of the total population - had been vaccinated against coronavirus, and estimated second doses would be completed by July 2021 following a donation of 10, 000 vaccinations from the government of India. As of August 2021, no cases of coronavirus had been reported in Nauru.

Weblinks 
 naurugov.nr: Hon. Isabella Dageago, MP. (with photo)

References

Year of birth missing (living people)
Living people
Members of the Parliament of Nauru
People from Yaren District
Government ministers of Nauru
21st-century women politicians
Women government ministers of Nauru
21st-century Nauruan politicians